Kehys-Kainuu is a subdivision of Kainuu and one of the Sub-regions of Finland since 2009.

Municipalities
Hyrynsalmi
Kuhmo
Puolanka
Suomussalmi

Sub-regions of Finland
Geography of Kainuu